The Kiamichi Economic Development District of Oklahoma (KEDDO) is a voluntary association of cities, counties and special districts in Southeastern Oklahoma.

Based in Wilburton, the Kiamichi Economic Development District of Oklahoma is a member of the Oklahoma Association of Regional Councils (OARC).

Counties served
Choctaw
Haskell
Latimer
Le Flore
McCurtain
Pittsburg
Pushmataha

Largest cities in the region

Demographics
As of the census of 2000, there were 175,957 people, 67,896 households, and 48,946 families residing within the region. The racial makeup of the region was 75.87% White, 4.54% African American, 13.20% Native American, 0.22% Asian, 0.03% Pacific Islander, 0.97% from other races, and 5.17% from two or more races. Hispanic or Latino of any race were 2.63% of the population.

The median income for a household in the region was $24,786, and the median income for a family was $30,485. The per capita income for the region was $13,529.

References

External links
Kiamichi Economic Development District of Oklahoma - Official site.

Oklahoma Association of Regional Councils